Baragiano is a town and comune in the province of Potenza, in the Southern Italian region of Basilicata. It is bounded by the comuni of Balvano, Bella, Picerno, Ruoti.

Twin towns
 Jalasjärvi, Finland

Cities and towns in Basilicata